Karl Potter may refer to:

Karl Harrington Potter, an Indologist and professor of Philosophy
Karl Potter, a member of the Italian rock band Banco del Mutuo Soccorso